Orchelimum fidicinium, the seaside meadow katydid, is a species of meadow katydid in the family Tettigoniidae.  It is found in the Eastern time zone of North America.

References

Further reading

 
 

fidicinium
Insects described in 1907